Luis Alberto Pedemonte (born 4 May 1920) is an Uruguayan retired professional football player.

1920 births
Possibly living people
Uruguayan footballers
Liverpool F.C. (Montevideo) players
Uruguayan expatriate footballers
Expatriate footballers in Italy
Serie A players
Inter Milan players
Association football defenders